Angelo Varetto (10 October 1910 in Turin – 8 October 2001 in Milan) was an Italian cyclist.

He was professional from 1934 to 1938.

Palmarès
1934
Asti-Ceriale

1936
Milan–San Remo
Coppa Caldirola

References

1910 births
2001 deaths
Italian male cyclists
Cyclists from Turin